Ian Hare is a former professional rugby league footballer who played in the 1960s.

International honours
Ian Hare won a cap for Great Britain while at Widnes in 1967 against France.

References

External links
!Great Britain Statistics at englandrl.co.uk (statistics currently missing due to not having appeared for both Great Britain, and England)

Living people
English rugby league players
Great Britain national rugby league team players
Place of birth missing (living people)
Rugby league wingers
Widnes Vikings players
Year of birth missing (living people)